The Hyundai Tiburon known in Europe as the Hyundai Coupé (현대 쿠페) is a sports coupe that was produced by the South Korean manufacturer Hyundai from 1996 to 2008.

The name "Tiburon", a slight variation of "tiburón", the Spanish word for "shark", is the name given to the North American, Australian, New Zealand, South African, and Austrian production of the vehicle. It was known as the Hyundai Coupe in some European markets and Indonesia. It had been branded as the Turbulence (터뷸런스) and Tuscani (투스카니) in the home South Korean market.

The model had been released in two generations (RC) over its lifespan and in that time these generations have been subject to periodic facelifts. These facelifts have attempted to keep the car up to date with various safety improvements and a mixture of changes to exterior and interior styling. The RD Tiburon was in production for 5 years from 1996 to 2001. The GK Tiburon was introduced in 2002 (as a 2003 model) and ended production in 2008 before being replaced by the Hyundai Veloster.

First generation (RD; 1996)

RD (1996–1999)
Tiburon first began production in late 1996. This generation took several design cues from the "HCD-II Epoch" concept that debuted at the 1993 Detroit Auto Show. It was available in a few foreign markets with engine choices of either 1.6L or 1.8L. In the United States, the Tiburon was first offered in 1997 with base models using the Elantra's 1.8L  engine while the upscale FX received a 2.0L four-cylinder engine. Base weight was around 2,550 lb (1,150 kg), giving the RD Tiburon a higher power-to-weight ratio than the newer GK 2.0L. The 2.0L produces a 0–60 mph time of ~8.3, with a 1/4 mile time of ~16 seconds. In 1998 the Tiburon lost its weaker 1.8L engine, giving both models the 2.0L. All versions of the Tiburon manufactured from 1996 to 2002 are known as "RD" Tiburons. The MacPherson strut suspension was co-developed with Porsche.

Its appearance was a revival of coke bottle styling, popular during the 1960s and 1970s. There were various options, with or without ABS, 2 airbags, leather, and sunroof.

RD Special Editions (UK) – F2 and F2 Evolution
Various special editions were also produced, focusing primarily on cosmetic modifications and improvements. In the UK, Hyundai's entrance into the Formula 2 World Rally Championship saw the release of the "F2" and "F2 Evolution" models in 1998 and 1999 respectively.

The "F2" (non-Evolution) was released in July 1998. Only available in the UK (where it was called the Hyundai Coupe), the "F2" model sold approximately 1100 units in total during 1998 and 1999, (making the "F2" a slightly rarer model than the "F2 Evolution" which followed). An enhanced version of the UK-spec 2.0 SE, the "F2" was available in a choice of three colours; Black (solid), Bright Silver (metallic), or Racing Blue (mica). (This latter colour, a vivid bright blue, was unique to the "F2"; no other Hyundai models were ever made available in Racing Blue (mica)). The "F2" modifications included 16" diameter x 7.5J multi-spoke DTM-style alloy wheels. These wheels were fitted with carbon-fibre effect centre-caps incorporating the "F2" logo within. According to Hyundai's "Coupe F2 Tyre Supplement Handbook", (supplied with each new Coupe F2), these wheels were described as "Motorsport-style alloy wheels". These wheels were high-quality for an OEM alloy wheel, weighing only 17.6 lbs (8.0 kg) per corner and closely emulating the style of the TSW Hockenheim R.

Tyres were Pirelli 225/40/16 P7000 directional, their 225 width and 40 profile made these the most aggressive standard-fit tyre supplied with any RD (or RD2) Hyundai Coupe. The "F2" also featured a deeper and more aggressive front spoiler, incorporating an oval chrome mesh grille insert. There was also "F2" badging on the front wings and rear valance, an uprated CD/tuner stereo by Sony (CDX C5000R with RDS), "Coupe F2" monogrammed aluminium kick plates, a unique leather-and-aluminium gearstick and a discreet "Coupe F2" badge on the ashtray fascia. The front carpet mats were inlaid with rectangular silver-coloured "Coupe F2" badges. According to the Hyundai Coupe F2 brochure, total on-the-road price was £17,999 (as of July 1998).

Two further items were available free to the first five-hundred Hyundai Coupe F2 buyers. Firstly, there was a large aluminium-bound "F2" art book, (including various artistic photographs and designer images of the Coupe F2). These books were signed inside by rally driver Kenneth Eriksson, (one of Hyundai's drivers in the F2 World Rally Championship at the time). Secondly, there was an aluminium key-fob, fitted with an LED light and supplied in a small silver-coloured box labelled "Lexon Design Concept". Both of these items were packaged together in a large silver cardboard box with "F2" printed onto the lid. These items were supplied by the dealer upon collection of the new car. During 1998, there was prominent press and billboard advertising in the UK to promote the new "Coupe F2". These advertisements incorporated the tag-line, "On average, men think about the F2 every 6 seconds."

The "F2 Evolution" became available on 14 June 1999, almost one-year after the "F2" had appeared. The "F2" was discontinued and the new "F2 Evolution" effectively replaced it. The "F2 Evolution" was available with just two colour options, either Silver (metallic) or Cobalt Blue (metallic). It was intended as a limited edition of 1500 units, (though 1513 units were eventually produced). The design was led by McLaren F1 stylist Peter Stevens in conjunction with Hyundai World Rally Team's support company Motor Sport Developments (MSD).

Standard 2.0 SE Coupes were delivered to MSD for mechanical and cosmetic modification. These modifications included a bigger front bumper/spoiler, a modified (larger and higher) rear spoiler with end-plates (these spoilers were designed by Stevens to create zero lift rather than ultimate downforce), a high-lift inlet camshaft (taken from the 1997 1.8-litre Lantra engine) and a 6"x4" freeflow exhaust by Magnex (suppliers to Aston Martin). Wheels were 16" diameter x 7.0J 5-spoke alloys manufactured by TSW (with Yokohama 205/45/16 tyres).  There were "F2 Evolution" badges on the front wings and rear valance. Vehicle security was provided by a Thatcham-approved Category 1 alarm/immobiliser system. Inside, there was an uprated Sony stereo, "Coupe F2 Evolution" monogrammed aluminium kick plates, thicker lambswool carpets and cream instrument dials incorporating "F2 Evolution" logos. The front carpet mats were inlaid with silver-coloured circular "Coupe F2 Evolution" badges. The armrest lid between the front seats was covered in stitched leather (rather than the molded plastic found on lesser models). The gear leaver gaiter was of smooth leather, with a chrome trim surround at the base, manufactured by Richbrook. The gear-knob was of a unique design and had a chrome finish. Additionally, new brake pads were co-developed for the F2 Evolution by MSD and AP Racing, these new pads provided better "bite" and improved fade resistance.

The mechanical changes were limited to the camshaft and exhaust improvements.

Each car was supplied with a metal MSD badge. This was fitted onto the bulkhead inside the engine bay. This badge displayed the MSD build number of each particular conversion to "F2 Evolution" spec.

Unlike with the previous year's "F2" model, this time no dealer-supplied art-book was supplied. However, a range of "F2 Evolution" lifestyle accessories were made available through Hyundai dealerships, such as "F2 Evolution" branded pens, chairs, clothing and umbrellas etc.

According to Hyundai's product-launch literature, total on-the-road price for the "F2 Evolution" was £19,299 (as of June 1999).

RD2 (1999–2001)

The RD2 Tiburon is an update on the original RD platform and was released for sale in 1999. The RD2 received a facelift that altered the front and rear bumpers and also provided a refreshed interior dash. In South Korea, the RD2 Tiburon was marketed as the "Tiburon Turbulence".

The RD2 headlights have separate enclosures for the high and low beams giving the four headlight look, similar to the third generation Honda/Acura Integra and the sixth generation Toyota Celica. The rear bumper is also reformed receiving larger taillights. The same  2.0L engine was carried over producing identical performance. ABS, leather seats, and a sunroof were available in a package.

Engineering
 1.6 L inline-4-cylinder DOHC Beta
 @ 5,800 rpm and 143 Nm (106 lb·ft) torque @ 4,500 rpm.

 1.8 L inline 4-cylinder Beta (1997 Base)
 @ 6,000 rpm and 171 Nm (122 lb·ft) torque @ 5,000 rpm.

 2.0 L inline 4-cylinder Beta 1CVT (1997 FX, 1998–2001)
 @ 6,000 rpm and 180 Nm (133 lb·ft) torque @ 4,800 rpm.

From 1997 to 1999 The Tiburon was offered with a 5-speed manual transmission standard, while a 4-speed automatic w/ overdrive was optional.

Performance
 1.6-litre:
Acceleration 0–60 mph: 10.8 seconds
Top speed:  (Auto)  (Manual)

 1.8-litre:
Acceleration 0–60 mph: 9.0 seconds
Top speed: 

 2.0-litre:
Acceleration 0–60 mph: 8.3 seconds
Top Speed:  (Auto)  (Manual)

Second generation (GK; 2001) 

The previous-generation Tiburon was discontinued in 2001 after five years in production. Hyundai launched a revised Tiburon in 2002 for the 2003 model year, giving it new styling, larger dimensions, and an optional V6 engine. In the US, base and GT V6 models were offered with standard front side airbags and optional anti-lock brakes. Base Tiburons retained the  2.0-liter four-cylinder engine, while GT V6 coupes got the new 2.7-liter  V6 from Hyundai's Sonata and Santa Fe. A five-speed manual transmission was standard, and a four-speed automatic was optional. The automatic unit had a manual shift gate. Also optional on the GT V6 was a six-speed manual gearbox. Base models and GT V6 automatics rode on 16-inch tires, versus 17-inch for the GT V6 manual models. Tuscani models had all the upgrades being the "Elite" model with separate badging to set it apart from all other models. Both had standard four-wheel disc brakes. Leather upholstery was standard in the GT V6, as well as a rear spoiler (high spoiler std. on 6-speed only). Aluminium pedals and a sunroof were optional.

In 2004, all GT V6s received 17" wheels. A "special edition" of the GT V6 was also released. It featured a "Special Edition" decal-style badge underneath "Tiburon", sport cloth upholstery, a Kenwood stereo, red painted front brake calipers, and multigauges above the radio. Only the 6-speed and automatic transmissions were available. The special edition was available in Jet Black, Rally Red, and Sunburst Yellow only. The new design received praise from a number of automotive journalists, some of which compared it to the Ferrari 456.

In 2005 Hyundai facelifted the Tiburon and reshuffled the model lineup; offering GS, GT, and SE models. The SE was now a separate trim from the GT models. Hyundai's four-cylinder engine went into the GS, while the other two held the 2.7-liter V6. A five-speed manual transmission was standard. A four-speed automatic with a manual shift was optional for GS and GT models, but the SE had exclusive use of a six-speed manual gearbox. Anti-lock brakes was standard on the SE and optional for the GT coupe, which could be equipped with leather upholstery. GS coupes rode on 16-inch wheels, versus 17-inch for other models. All-disc brakes and front side airbags were standard. Anti-lock brakes were made standard on all 2006 model Tiburons.

In the UK, three models were available before and after the 2005 facelift: the 1.6S, 2.0SE and V6. The 1.6S had a single exhaust and leather seats were optional, although following the 2005 facelift half-leather seats were standard. Both other models have twin exhausts and leather seats as standard. The six-speed gearbox was also standard on the V6 model.

A popular modification saw owners of the first GK model removing the air-filter resonator box.  The resonator box was located directly in front of the front left hand side wheel, behind the fender.  This allowed for a greater airflow to the air filter, gaining a minimal increase of brake horsepower (bhp). Hyundai, seeking cost cuts, adopted this modification for 2004+ models. Hyundai also released a new color for their 2006 Tiburon called Regatta blue, between Tidal Wave blue and Midnight blue, which is Metallic. This color is also available for the 2007 Elantra and Tiburon.

In Greece (S145 model) and perhaps other countries, due to high taxation in hi-displacement engines, a 1.6-liter Turbocharged engine was available for some years, producing 145 PS(107 kW) at 5,800 rpm and 190 Nm (128 lbf) of torque at 4,300 rpm and making the 1233 kg vehicle capable of accelerating from 0–100 km/h (0–62 mph) in 9.3 seconds and achieving a top speed of 210 km/h (131 mph). Fuel consumption was 6.4L/100 km (36.8 mpg).

GK F/L (2004–2006)

Hyundai conducted minor tweaks to the 'GK' model in September 2004 for the 2005 model year. The vehicle incorporated reworked sleeker blackened "smoked" headlights, redesigned rear tail lights, more aggressive front air dam, a different range of alloy wheel designs, colored stitching on leather seats (half leather seats available for the 1.6 range).
In 2006, Hyundai released the GT Limited Model. This was an upgrade from the GT V6. It included an upgraded tan leather interior, automatic climate controls, a 440w Infinity 6-disc in dash stereo with 10" subwoofer, an upgraded gauge cluster, and side markers. The GT LTD came in black, Blue, and midnight blue.

TS (2005–2006) Australian limited editions

In Australia, a limited edition TS was released in October 2005. It had a unique "tiger orange" color paintjob (a color that was not available for any other model) and an extra high rear spoiler. The TS also sported stiffer suspension dampening and a slightly thicker (22mm) rear sway bar. Black leather trim with red stitching, sunroof and other extras were included as standard. The name TS stands for "Tiger Shark", referring to its exclusive orange color and the shark origins of the Tiburon name.

Only 80 of these 2005 TS models were released. Each had an individually numbered ID plate inside the driver's door frame. Number 1 had a manual transmission, and number 80 had an automatic transmission.

A limited edition TS of the 2006 model was also released in 2006. It was available in a unique "vivid blue" paintjob. Only 62 of these were released. These also had a plaque inside the drivers side door, however, this didn't list the build number unlike the 2005 edition.

GK F/L2 (2006–2008)

A more comprehensive facelift was launched in November 2006 for the 2007 model year, named the Coupe SIII in markets such as the UK, this time altering the appearance of the car enough to designate it the fourth generation or GK F/L2 reminiscent of the RD1 and RD2 denotations.

The headlights are thinner and angled more aggressively; somewhat similar to the original Tiburon headlights with more straight/sharp lines. The tail lights are similar to the RD2 and GK1 but are somewhat smaller and reflect an aftermarket styling. The fenders lose the "gill fins" and other small changes are seen.

The interior is updated with brushed aluminium accents, new blue backlight scheme for gauges and instrumentation and new seats.

Hyundai later introduced the limited, special edition TSIII (UK). This upgraded, limited edition included quilted leather interior with embroidered logos, stiffer sports suspension, quad exhaust exit pipes, a higher level rear spoiler and an anthracite finish to the alloy wheels. The performance of the TSIII remained the same as the SIII. This is the last model made.

Equipment and safety
The exact specification depends on model and the region where it was sold but these are some
of the features available:

 Anti-lock brakes, Dual Circuit with brake force distribution
 Front (variable rate) airbags and side airbags
 Side impact protection bars
 ESP (2007)
 Traction Control
 Electric windows, sunroof
 Heated front seats
 Trip Computer
 Air Conditioning / Climate Control
 Leather / Half-leather / Cloth interior
 Sports seats
 Alloy wheels (16" or 17")
 CD player with cassette and radio
 Additional gauges featuring torque, real-time fuel consumption and battery voltage

The 2004–2007 models received a 4/5 star rating from the National Highway Traffic Safety Administration in the USA.

Powertrain

In the US, the 5-speed retained standard on the GS, GT, and GT Limited, while the upscale SE model came only with a six-speed manual. A four-speed automatic transmission with Shiftronic was available for all models.

In the UK and Middle East, the 5-speed manual is standard on the 1.6L and 2.0L versions, while a 6-speed is standard on the top of line 2.7L FX model, A four-speed automatic transmission with Shiftronic was available for 2.0L & 2.7L as well.

Performance
Magazines road test performance of the car:-

 2.7-litre: (5-speed)
 Acceleration 0–
 Car and Driver 7.6s
 Acceleration 0–
 Car and Driver 20.9s
 1/4 Mile
 15.7s@
 Top speed:
Car and Driver 
 2.7-litre: (6-speed)
 Acceleration 0–
 MotorTrend 7.0s
 Car and Driver 7.1s
 MotorWeek 7.1s
 Road and Track 7.2s (2007)
 Road and Track 7.6s (2003)
 Acceleration 0–
 Road and Track 19.3s (2007)
 Car and Driver 20.6s
 Road and Track 21s (2003)
 1/4 Mile
 MotorWeek 15.4s@
 Road and Track 15.4s@
 Car and Driver 15.6s@
 Road and Track 15.9s@
 Top speed:

Road and Track  (2007)
Road and Track  (2003)
Car and Driver

Marketing and branding

The car is branded as the Hyundai Coupe in some European markets and the Middle East.

In some markets the model is sold and branded as a Tuscani. For example, in South Korea, the Tuscani wears a circular badge containing a smaller circle of black and grey horizontal bars which is overlaid with a letter 'T' painted gold on the left and silver on the right. Even in markets where the car is sold as a Hyundai Tiburon or Hyundai Coupe, the name Tuscani has become quite popular. Many cars have been modified aftermarket to be rebadged with Tuscani emblems. In Canada, a special edition of the Tiburon is sold as a "Tuscani edition".  There was a rumour that Hyundai is considering a plan to branch off the Tuscani name as a complete sub brand for more exclusive, sporty, and upmarket models. The existence of the name is most likely to achieve greater sales where the Hyundai name has cloying associations with more budget products.

In some markets, the badge was used with the Tiburon name. For example, the photo of the badge is from the front an Australian 2005 model Tiburon TS, which used the badge on the front and rear exterior with the Hyundai logo on the steering wheel.

In some markets secondary badging may denote engine size and variations such as trim, wheel, and other options. These badges include GS, GT, SE and FX, although some use FX across the entire range available. In certain markets, certain exterior colors are not available and identification may require noticing subtle local differences such as alloy wheels, spoilers or dealer fit options such as in car entertainment systems. These can all change from year to year and from market to market, so the variation is quite significant. One notable difference is that the 1.6 engine always has a single exhaust on the right hand side, in all markets where it is sold.

Sales

See also
Hyundai Genesis Coupe, a Rear Wheel Drive Hyundai sports car

References

External links

Tiburon
Front-wheel-drive sports cars
Sport compact cars
2000s cars
Cars introduced in 1996
Coupés
Rally cars